The 2015–16 Seton Hall Pirates men's basketball team represented Seton Hall University in the 2015–16 NCAA Division I men's basketball season. The Pirates played home games in Newark, New Jersey at the Prudential Center, with one exhibition and one regular season game at Walsh Gymnasium in South Orange, New Jersey.  They were coached, for the sixth year, by Kevin Willard. They were members of the Big East Conference. They finished the season 25–9, 12–6 in Big East play to finish in third place. They defeated Creighton, Xavier, and the eventual national champion Villanova to become champions of the Big East tournament. They received the Big East Conference's automatic bid to the NCAA tournament where they lost in the first round to Gonzaga.

Previous season
The Pirates finished the season 16–15, 6-12 in Big East play to finish in a tie for seventh place. They lost in the first round of the Big East tournament to Marquette.

Departures

Incoming transfers

Incoming recruits

Roster

Schedule
 
|-
!colspan=9 style="background:#004488; color:#D3D3D3;"| Exhibition

|-
!colspan=9 style="background:#004488; color:#D3D3D3;"| Non-conference regular season

|-
!colspan=9 style="background:#004488; color:#D3D3D3;"| Big East Regular Season

|-
!colspan=9 style="background:#004488; color:#D3D3D3;"| Big East tournament

|-

|-

|-
!colspan=9 style="background:#004488; color:#D3D3D3;"| NCAA tournament

Rankings

References

Seton Hall
Seton Hall Pirates men's basketball seasons
Seton Hall
Seton Hall
Seton Hall